The filmography of Jessica Lange comprises both film and television roles. In a career spanning 45 years, she has appeared in overall 33 feature films, seven TV movies, and eight series. In addition to theater arts, her name has been credited in other works of non-fiction, such as documentaries. According to Box Office Mojo, thirty-one of Lange's feature films have grossed a total of approximately $1 billion worldwide with an average of $33.74 million per title.

Lange's acting debut was in the monster movie King Kong (1976), for which she received her first Golden Globe Award, which was followed by a role in the musical All That Jazz (1979), her second role in the 1970s.

Throughout the 1980s, she starred in ten major motion pictures, five of which earned her Academy Award nominations and four at the Golden Globes, respectively. Winning both awards for her role in Tootsie (1982), her other notable roles included the films Frances (1982), Country (1984) (so far also her only work she also co-produced), Sweet Dreams (1985), and Music Box (1989). Simultaneously, the actress made her first appearance on stage in the summer theater production Angel on My Shoulder (1980), as well as making her debut on TV, starring in a remake of the Tennessee Williams' play Cat on a Hot Tin Roof (1984), her only contribution to the medium over that period of time.

The subsequent decade, Lange played a line-up of additional leads of comparable quality, appearing in ten theatrical films and three television productions. Among others, her 1990s titles included Men Don't Leave (1990), O Pioneers! (1992), Blue Sky (1994), A Streetcar Named Desire (1995), A Thousand Acres (1997), and Titus (1999). In the 1990s, the actress was nominated for one Oscar, which she won, four Golden Globes, winning two, and an Emmy; her first nomination ever. She would also receive additional nominations for some then newly established accolades, such as the Screen Actors Guild Award and Satellite Award, being nominated once each. Beside playing her first one-off voice role for television, she reprised her role in another play by Williams for the Broadway's stage Ethel Barrymore Theatre in 1992, for which she received a Theater World Award and an Outer Critics Circle Award nomination for Best Actress – Play, respectively.

As Lange reached her fifties, her screen career began to decline. In exchange, though, Lange found a place most notably on TV. As a result of starring in three productions, such as Normal (2003), Sybil (2007) and Grey Gardens (2009), she extended her accolades with two Golden Globe nominations and an Emmy award. She would also earn additional two Satellite Awards nominations, and a second SAG Award nomination. On screen, however, the actress mainly played secondary roles. Aside from Bonneville (2006), her only lead part from the 2000s, she would mainly join supporting casts in six major films following the start of the millennium. She also continued to appear on stage on at least two separate occasions; in Long Day's Journey into Night (2000) at the London's Lyric Theatre, recognized with a Laurence Olivier Award nomination, and in The Glass Menagerie (2005), back again at the Ethel Barrymore Theatre in New York City. In 2009, she contributed to a soundtrack composed by Rachel Portman for Grey Gardens as a lead vocalist.

In the 2010s, Lange gained new recognition by starring in FX's horror anthology, American Horror Story (2011–2015, 2018). The show has exposed her work to a new generation of TV viewers, earning her four Emmy nominations, of which she won two, four Golden Globe nominations, earning one win, three SAG award nominations, winning her first, and two Satellite Award nominations, having won in a special achievement category. Among others, she has also received four nominations for the Critics' Choice TV Awards, earning one trophy, as well as four nominations for the Saturn Awards and one People's Choice Awards nomination. On screen in the 2010s, she played three supporting roles: in the romantic drama The Vow (2012), the erotic thriller In Secret (2013), and a remake of the 1974 crime film The Gambler in 2014. Her most recent appearances include the dramedy web series Horace and Pete (2016) and the road trip comedy film Wild Oats (2016). On stage, Lange reprised her 2000 role in a Broadway production of Eugene O'Neill's Long Day's Journey into Night, In 2017, Lange starred in FX's new series Feud: Bette and Joan as Joan Crawford. In 2018, Lange reprised her role of Constance Langdon in American Horror Story: Apocalypse, while in 2019, she co-starred in Netflix's series The Politician.

Film

Television

Stage

Discography

Soundtracks

Other albums

Singles

As lead artist

Unreleased tracks

See also
 Jessica Lange bibliography
 Jessica Lange discography
 AFI's 100 Years...100 Movies (10th Anniversary Edition)
 List of awards and nominations received by Jessica Lange
 List of highest-grossing films in Canada and the United States

Footnotes

References

Sources

External links
 
 
 

Filmography
Actress filmographies
American filmographies